Kao Fong College of Digital Contents (KFCDC) was a private college in Changzhi Township, Pingtung County, Taiwan.

History
KFCDC was originally established as Kao Fong College on 1 August 2004. In August 2009, the college was renamed Kao Fong College of Digital Contents. In February 2014, the college announced that it would close in March, reportedly due to low enrollment and heavy debt. After the campus closure, the university building will be transformed into elementary and secondary schools in 2016.

Faculties
The college had nine departments: Digital Animation Design, Digital Audio and Video Design, Digital Commerce, Digital Game Design, Digital Media Design, Distribution Management, Leisure and Recreation English, Leisure and Recreation Management, and Techno-Craft Design.

References

External links
 

2004 establishments in Taiwan
2014 disestablishments in Taiwan
Defunct universities and colleges in Taiwan